Palangin (also Romanized as Palangīn) is a village in Ab Barik Rural District, in the Central District of Sonqor County, Kermanshah Province, Iran. At the 2006 census, its population was 89, in 23 families.

References 

Populated places in Sonqor County